Terézia Páleníková (born August 16, 1995) is a Slovak basketball player for Ślęza Wrocław and the Slovak national team.

She participated at the EuroBasket Women 2017.

References

1995 births
Living people
Slovak women's basketball players
Sportspeople from Bratislava
Small forwards